Gasherbrum I, surveyed as K5 and also known as Hidden Peak, is the 11th highest mountain in the world at  above sea level. It is located between Shigar District in the Gilgit–Baltistan region of Pakistan and Tashkurgan in the Xinjiang of China. Gasherbrum I is part of the Gasherbrum Massif, located in the Karakoram region of the Himalaya. Gasherbrum is often claimed to mean  "Shining Wall", presumably a reference to the highly visible face of the neighboring peak Gasherbrum IV; but in fact, it comes from "rgasha" (beautiful) + "brum" (mountain) in Balti, hence it actually means "beautiful mountain."

Gasherbrum I was designated K5 (meaning the 5th peak of the Karakoram) by T.G. Montgomerie in 1856 when he first spotted the peaks of the Karakoram from more than 200 km away during the Great Trigonometric Survey of India. In 1892, William Martin Conway provided the alternate name, Hidden Peak, in reference to its extreme remoteness.

Gasherbrum I was first climbed on July 5, 1958, by Pete Schoening and Andy Kauffman of an eight-man American expedition led by Nicholas B. Clinch, Richard K. Irvin, Tom Nevison, Tom McCormack, Bob Swift and Gil Roberts were also members of the team.

Timeline
 1934 - A large international expedition, organized by the Swiss G.O. Dyhrenfurth, explores Gasherbrum I and II.
 1958 - An American team led by Nicholas Clinch including two Pakistani army officers captain Mohammad Akram and captain S.T.H Rizvi makes the first ascent, via Roch ridge.
 1975 - Reinhold Messner and Peter Habeler reached the summit on a new route (northwest route) in pure alpine style (first time on an 8000-metre peak) taking three days total. One day later, a team of three led by Austrian Hanns Schell reached the summit on the American route.
 1977 - The fourth successful ascent by two Slovenians (Nejc Zaplotnik and Andrej Stremfelj), again on a new route.  Team member Drago Bregar died.
 1980 - Frenchmen Maurice Barrard and Georges Narbaud are successful with the fifth ascent and pass the South Ridge for the first time.
 1981 - A Japanese team follows the Clinch route with fixed ropes for the sixth successful ascent.
 1982 - Michael Dacher, Siegfried Hupfauer and Günter Sturm of a German expedition summit via a new route on the north face. In the same year, French Marie-José Vallençant is the first woman who reaches the summit. Her husband, Sylvain Saudan from Switzerland, performs the first ski descent from the top of an 8000-metre peak to base camp.
 1983 - Jerzy Kukuczka with Wojciech Kurtyka, new route. Alpine style ascent without the aid of oxygen.
 1983 - Teams from Switzerland and Spain are successful.
 1984 - Reinhold Messner and Hans Kammerlander traverse Gasherbrum II and Gasherbrum I without returning to base camp in between
 1985 - Solo ascent by Benoît Chamoux. On July 14, the Italian Giampiero Di Federico (solo ascent) opens a new route on the north-west face.
 1997 - Magnus Rydén and Johan Åkerström reach the summit.
 2003 - 19 people reach the summit, 4 deaths, including Mohammad Oraz.
 2012 - March 9, Adam Bielecki (Poland) and Janusz Gołąb (Poland) made the first winter ascent. The ascent was made without the aid of supplementary oxygen. The same day, three climbers from a different expedition — Austrian Gerfried Goschl, Swiss Cedric Hahlen and Pakistani Nisar Hussain Sadpara — went missing, never to be found again. They were trying to ascend via a new route and are considered to have been blown off by strong winds.
 2013 - 7 July, Artur Hajzer died after falling in the Japanese Couloir after an attempt to reach the summit.
 2013 - 21 July, Spaniards Abel Alonso, Xebi Gomez and Álvaro Paredes climbed to the top to then disappear while descending after a storm.
 2017 - 30 July, in an alpine style six-day ascent without supplementary oxygen, Czechs Marek 'Mára' Holeček and Zdeněk Hák established a new route named Satisfaction! (in memory of Zdeněk Hrubý) up the Southwest Face.

See also
 List of mountains in Pakistan
 Highest Mountains of the World

Bibliography

Notes and references

External links
 Gasherbrum I on Summitpost
 Gasherbrum I on Himalaya-Info.org (German)
 
 Summit Video of Alex Gavan's First Romanian Ascent of Gasherbrum 1 (July 30th 2007)

Eight-thousanders of the Karakoram
Mountains of Xinjiang
Mountains of Gilgit-Baltistan
China–Pakistan border
International mountains of Asia